Drop Dead, Gorgeous was an American post-hardcore band from Denver, Colorado. It consisted of frontman Danny Stillman (lead vocals), Kyle Browning (lead guitar), Jake Hansen (bass), Dan Gustavson (rhythm guitar), Jonathan Leary (keys/synth/programming) and Danny Cooper (drums, percussion). They released three full-length albums, as well as an EP. Their 2009 album, The Hot N' Heavy, was charted by Billboard at No. 6 on the  Top Heatseekers chart, No. 23 on the Independent Albums chart, and No. 192 on The Billboard 200.

Background
In June 2007, Drop Dead, Gorgeous played along with fellow Rise Records label mates The Devil Wears Prada, Dance Gavin Dance, and At the Throne of Judgment on the Rise Records tour.  From July 18 to July 22, they played a series of shows in Mexico, before joining the Vans Warped Tour 2007, playing dates from July 25 to August 25.

In 2007, Borland appeared on select tracks on Worse Than a Fairy Tale, by Colorado band Drop Dead, Gorgeous. Both artists are on Ross Robinson's I AM:WOLFPACK label.

In September and October 2007, they toured in support of Aiden with Still Remains, and 1997 on their first full headlining US tour. They also joined Alesana, Idiot Pilot, and The Number Twelve Looks Like You at the end of November. They filled in for Escape the Fate at the Australian Taste of Chaos shows.

In March 2009 they toured with Alesana, I Set My Friends on Fire, and Fear Before.

They then headlined "The Hot N' Heavy Tour" with support from He Is Legend, Before Their Eyes, and And Then There Were None. On the second half of the tour Eyes Set to Kill, Watchout! There's Ghosts, and Defending The Pilot joined in.

They went on tour again on October 9, 2009 in support of Blessthefall and Finch on the Atticus tour.
In Summer of 2010 they headlined a tour with band such a Scarlett O'Hara as well as Attila, Woe, Is Me, and Abandon All Ships.

On August 19, 2011, Stillman had confirmed that Drop Dead Gorgeous is currently on hiatus because each member was busy with other projects such as ManCub, The Bunny the Bear, Curses and It's Teeth. Although there have been pictures that show some members are already getting together writing music for the next album, the release of new music as Drop Dead, Gorgeous seems unlikely. 

In January 2012, Daniel Stillman and Danny Cooper confirmed that they are in an alternative rock project called Bleach Blonde signed under Rise Records.  They released a three track self-titled EP on January 22, 2013.

As of early 2013 their Facebook account had been deleted and their Twitter account now only promotes Stillman's electronica project, giving indication that members of Drop Dead, Gorgeous have no plans of continuing involvement of the band. 

In October of 2021, the bar Kyle Browning worked for Tweeted that he had suddenly passed away.

Members

 Final lineup
 Daniel "Stills" Stillman — lead vocals, keyboard, programming, additional guitars (2004–2011)
 Kyle Browning — lead guitar, synthesizers, programming, backing vocals (2004–2011, died 2011) 
 Jake Hansen — bass (2004–2011)
Danny Cooper — drums, percussion (2004–2011)
 Dan Gustavson — rhythm guitar (2004–2006, 2007–2010, 2011) 
 Jonathan "Duck" Leary — keyboards, synthesizers, piano, programming, percussion, organ, backing vocals (2007–2011)

 Previous members
 Aaron Rothe - keyboards, piano, synthesizer, programming, percussion, organ, vocals (2004–2007)
 Judah Leary — rhythm guitar, backing vocals (2006–2007)
 Daniel Passera - drums (2006-2009)
 Wyatt Olney — rhythm guitar, clean vocals (2004)
 Marcus Tallitsch - unclean vocals (2004)

Timeline

Discography
Albums
In Vogue (Rise, 2006)
Worse Than a Fairy Tale (Suretone, 2007)
The Hot N' Heavy (Suretone, 2009)

EPs
Be Mine, Valentine (Rise, 2006)

References

External links

Drop Dead, Gorgeous at Facebook

Musical groups from Denver
American post-hardcore musical groups
Rise Records artists
Musical groups established in 2004
Musical groups disestablished in 2011
Musical quintets
Rock music groups from Colorado
American screamo musical groups